Below are the squads for the 2005 FIFA World Youth Championship tournament in the Netherlands as stated at FIFA.com.
Players name marked in bold went on to earn full international caps.

Group A

Head coach:  Ange Postecoglou

Head coach:  Serge Devèze

Head coach:  Kiyoshi Okuma

Head coach:  Foppe de Haan

Group B

Head coach:  Eckhard Krautzun

Head coach:  Victor Mendieta

Head coach:  Şenol Ustaömer

Head coach:  Oleksiy Mykhaylychenko

Group C

Head coach:  José Sulantay

Head coach:  Rubén Guifarro

Head coach:  Fathi Jamal

Head coach:  Iñaki Sáez

Group D

Head coach:  Francisco Ferarro

Head coach:  Mohamed Radwan

Head coach:  Michael Skibbe

Head coach:  Sigi Schmid

Group E

Head coach:  Dale Mitchell

Head coach:  Eduardo Lara

Head coach:  Paolo Berrettini

Head coach:  Milosav Radenović

Group F

Head coach:  Renê Weber

Head coach:  Samson Siasia

Head coach:  Park Sung-hwa

Head coach:  Pierre-André Schürmann

References

FIFA U-20 World Cup squads